Data Lords is a large-ensemble jazz album by the Maria Schneider Orchestra that was released in 2020.

Summary
The tracks of the album are thematically organized in two sections, which the liner notes call "a story of two worlds" and are much like a two-disk release. The two sections are named "The Digital World" and "The Natural World".

Accolades 
 2021 - Finalist for the Pulitzer Prize for Music
 2021 - Grammy Award for Best Large Jazz Ensemble Album
 2021 - The track "Sputnik" won the Grammy Award for Best Instrumental Composition
 2021 - Le Grand Prix de l’Académie du Jazz for Best Record of the Year

Track listing

Personnel 

 Greg Gisbert – trumpet, flügelhorn
 Tony Kadleck – trumpet, flügelhorn
 Nadje Noordhuis – trumpet, flügelhorn
 Mike Rodriguez – trumpet, flügelhorn
 Marshall Gilkes – trombone
 Ryan Keberle – trombone
 Keith O'Quinn – trombone
 George Flynn – bass trombone
 Dave Pietro – alto saxophone, clarinet, piccolo, flute
 Steve Wilson – alto saxophone, soprano saxophone, clarinet, flute
 Donny McCaslin – tenor saxophone, flute
 Rich Perry – tenor saxophone
 Scott Robinson – baritone, Bb, bass & contrabass clarinets, muson
 Gary Versace – accordion
 Frank Kimbrough – piano
 Ben Monder – guitar
 Jay Anderson – bass
 Johnathan Blake – drums, percussion

Additional Credits 
 Producer: Brian Camelio, Maria Schneider, Ryan Truesdell
 Associate Producer: Zachary Bornheimer
 Engineering: Brian Montgomery, assisted by Charles Mueller and Edwin Huet
 Trumpet electronics programming on "CQ CQ, Is Anybody There?": Michael Lenssen
 Recording production assistance: Eunha So
 Mixing: Brian Montgomery and Maria Schneider
 Mastering: Gene Paul at G&J Audio, and Nate Wood

Package Design:
 Illustration: Aaron Horkey
 Graphic design: Cheri Dorr
 Print production: Franklin Press, Inc.
 Session photography: Briene Lermitte

 Video documentation on ArtistShare: Marie Le Claire assisted by Erin Harper

References

External links
 Data Lords page on ArtistShare.com
 Trailer
 Pre-concert interview

2020 albums
Big band albums
Grammy Award for Best Large Jazz Ensemble Album
Jazz albums by American artists
Maria Schneider (musician) albums
Works about the Internet